Rafael Obrador Burguera (born 18 November 2004) is a Spanish professional footballer who plays as a left-back for Real Madrid Castilla.

Club career
Born in Campos, Majorca, Balearic Islands, Obrador began playing football at the youth academy of CE Campos at the age of four, and joined RCD Mallorca's youth setup in 2014, aged ten. On 10 October 2019, while still a youth, he signed his first professional contract, agreeing to a deal until 2024.

On 19 July 2020, before even having appeared with the reserves, Obrador made his first team – and La Liga – debut for the Bermellones, coming on as a late substitute for Iddrisu Baba in a 2–2 away draw against CA Osasuna, as his side was already relegated. On 5 October, he moved to Real Madrid and returned to youth football.

International career
Obrador represented the Spain under-16s in a 3–3 tie against Mexico on 4 December 2019, where he scored the equalizer.

Career statistics

Club 
.

References

External links
 Real Madrid profile
 
 
 

2004 births
Living people
Footballers from Mallorca
Spanish footballers
Association football fullbacks
La Liga players
RCD Mallorca players
Spain youth international footballers
Real Madrid CF players